The Calixa-Lavallée Award is a music award created in 1959. It is granted by the Saint-Jean-Baptiste Society of Montreal (SSJBM) to a Quebecer having distinguished themself in the field of music. It was named after musician Calixa Lavallée, composer of the Canadian national anthem, "O Canada".

Laureates

 1959: Léopold Simoneau
 1959: Pierrette Alarie
 1960: Jacques Beaudry
 1961: Françoise Aubut-Pratte
 1962: Jean Papineau-Couture
 1963: Gilles Lefebvre
 1964: Victor Bouchard and Renée Morisset
 1965: Louis Quilico
 1966: Gilles Vigneault
 1967: Joseph Rouleau
 1968: Gilles Tremblay
 1969: Roger Matton
 1970: Clermont Pépin
 1971: Colette Boky
 1972: Claire Gagnier
 1973: Gaston Germain
 1974: Pauline Julien
 1975: Félix Leclerc
 1976: Jean Carignan
 1977: Lionel Daunais
 1979: Monique Leyrac
 1980: Serge Garant
 1981: Kenneth Gilbert
 1982: Marie-Thérèse Paquin
 1983: Gilles Potvin
 1985: Maryvonne Kendergi
 1987: Yvonne Hubert
 1988: Jean Cousineau
 1989: Bernard Lagacé
 1990: Otto Joachim
 1991: Louise André
 1993: Fernand Lindsay
 1996: Angèle Dubeau
 2003: Charlie Biddle
 2012: Alain Lefèvre

References
Le prix Calixa-Lavallée

See also

Félix Award

Canadian music awards
Saint-Jean-Baptiste Society
Quebec music
Quebec awards
1959 establishments in Quebec
Awards established in 1959